Ardi Idrus (born 22 January  1993) is an Indonesian professional footballer who plays as a full-back for Liga 1 club Bali United.

Club career

Persib Bandung
He was signed for Persib Bandung to play in Liga 1 in the 2018 season. Idrus made his league debut on 8 April 2018 in a match against Mitra Kukar at the Gelora Bandung Lautan Api Stadium, Bandung.

Bali United
Idrus was signed for Bali United to play in Liga 1 in the 2022–23 season. He made his league debut on 23 August 2022 in a match against Persib Bandung at the Gelora Bandung Lautan Api Stadium, Bandung.

Career statistics

Club

Honours

Individual 
Liga 1 Best Eleven: 2018

References

External links 
Ardi Idrus at Soccerway
Ardi Idrus at Liga Indonesia

Living people
1993 births
Indonesian footballers
People from Ternate
Sportspeople from North Maluku
Association football fullbacks
Liga 1 (Indonesia) players
Liga 2 (Indonesia) players
Persin Sinjai players
PSPS Pekanbaru players
PSPS Riau players
Persitara Jakarta Utara players
Persiram Raja Ampat players
Persepam Madura Utama players
Kalteng Putra F.C. players
PSS Sleman players
Persib Bandung players
Bali United F.C. players